The Royal Order of Pouono is the highest order of chivalry in the Kingdom of Tonga.

History 
The Order was established in 1893 by King George Tupou II. It is awarded by His Majesty, The Sovereign to foreign Heads of State only.

Class 
The Order consists of a single class: Knight Grand Cross with Collar. Its post-nominal letters are KGCCP.

Insignia 
The insignia consists of a Grand Collar with a Badge, a Star, a Sash with a Badge

The Grand Collar of the Order is a double gold chain set with a white enamel 6-pointed gold edged star (centre-piece), with on either side moving upwards;  a white enamel dove in flight, three crossed swords in gold, a 6-pointed white enamel & gold edged star. From it hangs the Collar Badge, a white enamel gold edged Maltese cross pendant from a gold Tongan crown, The gold central medallion has the "Pouono fale" (a six posted house) also in gold. The red enamel riband has the National  motto  "KO E ‘OTUA TONGA KO HOKU TOFI’A"  (sometimes written as "KOE OTUA MOTOGA KO HOKU TOFIA" due to a manufacturing error) in gold capital letters, in the base is a spray of gold laurel.

The Plaque is a gold 7-armed cross (each arm has seven finger-rays, the first & seventh being the same length, the second & sixth being smaller than the first etc., the third & fifth being smaller than the others, and the fourth is the smallest ray).
The white enamel central medallion has a golden "Pouono fale". The red riband has the gold National motto in capital letters, with a spray of gold laurel in the base.

The ribbon is a 102mm moire scarlet/light-cream/scarlet/light-cream/scarlet sash (proportions 6/20/50/20/6mm)

References

Orders, decorations, and medals of Tonga

Awards established in 1893
1893 establishments in Tonga
Pouono, Royal Order of